Michael Chang was the defending champion but lost in the semifinals to Karim Alami.

Alami won in the final 6–3, 6–4 against Nicklas Kulti. This was the last tournament of Jimmy Connors career, and he lost to Richey Reneberg in the first round.

Seeds
A champion seed is indicated in bold text while text in italics indicates the round in which that seed was eliminated.

  Michael Chang (semifinals)
  Richey Reneberg (semifinals)
  Javier Frana (quarterfinals)
  Michael Joyce (first round)
  Jonas Björkman (second round)
  Karim Alami (champion)
  Mats Wilander (first round)
  Chris Woodruff (first round)

Draw

References
 1996 AT&T Challenge Draw

1996 Singles
1996 ATP Tour